Calmont is a commune in the Aveyron department in southern France.

Population

See also
Communes of the Aveyron department

References
Official web site of Calmont

Communes of Aveyron
Aveyron communes articles needing translation from French Wikipedia